The acronym YGQ may refer to:
 Geraldton (Greenstone Regional) Airport
 Yang Guang Qing School of Beijing